Ophélie is the French equivalent of Ophelia

Music
Ophélie, character in Hamlet (opera) by Ambroise Thomas
"Ophélie", poem by Arthur Rimbaud set by:
"Ophélie", art song by Paul Hermann (composer)
"Ophélie", art song by Denis Gougeon
"Ophélie", popular song by Dominique Dalcan
"Ophélie", song Jad Wio and Nouvelle Vague (band)
"Ophélie", song Daniel Lavoie  
"Ophélie", song by Vanessa Paradis
"Ophélie (Douce ennemie)", Angelo Branduardi
"Ophélie flagrant des lits", Michel Polnareff
"Ophélie oh folie", Johnny Hallyday

People
Ophélie Winter (1974), French singer
Ophélie Meunier (1987), French television presenter  
Ophélie Gaillard (1974), French cellist 
Ophélie David (1976), French freestyle skier 
Ophélie Meilleroux, French football player
Ophélie Aspord (1991), French distance swimmer at the 2012 Summer Olympics

See also
:fr:Ophélie (La Défense), sculpture
:fr:Ophélie (pétrolier)